Dando Cocotazos is a reggaeton album released by artist Speedy (Sir Speedy Polaco) in November 2003. The album contains 14 tracks and was released on the Pina Records label. Appearances are made by Blade Pacino, DJ Blass (Vladimir Félix), DJ Reggie (Raymond Rosario) and others.

Track listing 
 Intro
 Ayúdame Imaginar
 No Te Me Quites (feat. Chaka y Benny)
 Como Mi Nena No Hay (feat. Master Joe y O.G. Black)
 Madre (feat. Gavilan)
 No Creo Yo en Ti (feat. Lito & Polaco)
 En Ti Me Paso Pensando (feat. Great Kilo)
 Te Quiero Mi Yal
 Tu Cuerpo Me Da Calor (feat. Jenay)
 Te Odio
 Cosas Divinas (feat. Alex y Gaby)
 Tu Cuerpo Quiere Más (feat. Blade Pacino)
 Mami  (feat. Yaga y Mackie)
 Esta Noche Quiero Yo (feat. Maicol y Manuel)

Speedy (musician) albums
2003 albums
Pina Records albums